Callophrys affinis, the western green hairstreak or immaculate green hairstreak, is a butterfly of the family Lycaenidae. It is found in western Canada and the western United States.

The wingspan is 20 to 28 mm. Adults are on the wing from early March to mid-June in one generation.

The larvae feed on Eriogonum umbellatum.

Subspecies
Listed alphabetically:
C. a. affinis
C. a. albipalpis Gorelick, 2005 (New Mexico)
C. a. apama Edwards, 1882 – Arizona canyon green hairstreak (Arizona)
C. a. homoperplexa Barnes & Benjamin, 1923 (Colorado)
C. a. washingtonia Clench, 1944 (Washington)

References

Immaculate Green Hairstreak (Callophrys affinis) Inventory in the South Okanagan and Boundary Region, British Columbia, 2009 - FINAL, BC Gov., Canada

Callophrys
Butterflies of North America
Butterflies described in 1862
Taxa named by William Henry Edwards